The 1994 Italian Superturismo Championship was the eighth edition of the Italian Superturismo Championship. The season began in Monza on 10 April and finished in Mugello on 2 October, after ten rounds. Emanuele Pirro won the championship (6 victories, 7 second places and scoring points in each round), driving an Audi 80 Quattro; the German manufacturer won the constructors' championship with 9 victories (6 Emanuele Pirro, 2 Frank Biela, 1 Rinaldo Capello) on 20 races. The strongest title contender was Antonio Tamburini, who drove an Alfa Romeo 155 TS and also got 6 victories. Third was Fabrizio Giovanardi, who was able to finish on podium 7 times and to score points in almost all races without a single victory. The three time Italian Champion Roberto Ravaglia had lot of bad luck and finished fourth after a single victory in the season. The privateers' trophy was won by Moreno Soli in his own the Alfa Romeo 155 TS.

Teams and drivers

Race calendar and results

Championship standings

 18 results from 20 are valid for the championship

Drivers' Championship

Note: second race in the second Mugello round was stopped early and half points were awarded.

Manufacturers' Trophy

Privateers' Championship

External links
1994 Drivers List
1994 Standings

Italian Superturismo Championship
Italian Superturismo
Italian Superturismo